Andrea Giacomo Podesta (1620-after 1640) was an Italian engraver and painter. He was born at Genoa, and traveled as a young man to Rome to apprentice under Giovanni Andrea Ferrari. He is best known for engravings of paintings of past masters such as Titian and Annibale Carracci.

References

1620 births
Italian Baroque painters
Italian engravers
17th-century Italian painters
Italian male painters
Painters from Genoa
Year of death unknown